The College of William & Mary (officially The College of William and Mary in Virginia, abbreviated as W&M) is a public research university in Williamsburg, Virginia. Founded in 1693 by a royal charter issued by King William III and Queen Mary II, it is the second-oldest institution of higher education in the United States and the ninth-oldest in the English-speaking world. It is classified among "R2: Doctoral Universities – High Research Activity". In his 1985 book Public Ivies: A Guide to America's Best Public Undergraduate Colleges and Universities, Richard Moll included William & Mary as one of the original eight "Public Ivies".

The college educated American presidents Thomas Jefferson, James Monroe, and John Tyler. It also educated other key figures pivotal to the development of the United States, including the first President of the Continental Congress Peyton Randolph, the first U.S. Attorney General Edmund Randolph, the fourth U.S. Supreme Court Chief Justice John Marshall, Speaker of the House of Representatives Henry Clay, Commanding General of the U.S. Army Winfield Scott, sixteen members of the Continental Congress, and four signers of the Declaration of Independence. Its connections with many Founding Fathers of the United States earned it the nickname "the Alma Mater of the Nation". George Washington received his surveyor's license from the college in 1749 and he would become the college's first American chancellor in 1788. The position was long held by Bishops of London and Archbishops of Canterbury, though in modern times has been held by U.S. Supreme Court Justices, Cabinet Secretaries, and British Prime Minister Margaret Thatcher. Benjamin Franklin received William & Mary's first honorary degree in 1756.

William & Mary is notable for its many firsts in American higher education. The F.H.C. Society, founded in 1750, was the first collegiate fraternity in the United States, and W&M students founded the Phi Beta Kappa academic honor society in 1776, the first Greek-letter fraternity. In 1736, W&M became the first school of higher education in the future United States to install a student honor code of conduct. It is the only American university issued a coat of arms by the College of Arms in London. The establishment of graduate programs in law and medicine in 1779 makes it one of the first universities in the United States. The Marshall–Wythe School of Law is the oldest law school in the United States, and the Sir Christopher Wren Building, attributed to the famed English architect, is the oldest academic building in continuous use in the United States.

History

Colonial era (1693–1776)

A school of higher education for both Native American young men and the sons of the colonists was one of the earliest goals of the leaders of the Colony of Virginia. The college was founded on February 8, 1693, under a royal charter to "make, found and establish a certain Place of Universal Study, a perpetual College of Divinity, Philosophy, Languages, and other good arts and sciences ... to be supported and maintained, in all time coming." Named in honor of the reigning monarchs King William III and Queen Mary II, the college is the second oldest college in the United States. The original plans for the college date back to 1618 at Henrico but were thwarted by the Indian Massacre of 1622, a change in government (in 1624, the Virginia Company's charter was revoked by King James I and the Virginia Colony was transferred to royal authority as a crown colony), events related to the English Civil War, and Bacon's Rebellion. In 1695, before the town of Williamsburg existed, construction began on the College Building, now known as the Sir Christopher Wren Building, in what was then called Middle Plantation (Virginia). It is the oldest college building in America. The college is one of the country's nine Colonial Colleges founded before the American Revolution. The charter named James Blair as the college's first president (a lifetime appointment which he held until his death in 1743). William & Mary was founded as an Anglican institution; students were required to be members of the Church of England, and professors were required to declare adherence to the Thirty-Nine Articles.

In 1693, the college was given a seat in the House of Burgesses and it was determined the college would be supported by tobacco taxes and export duties on furs and animal skins. The college acquired a  parcel for the new school,  from Jamestown. In 1694, the new school opened in temporary buildings.

Williamsburg was granted a royal charter as a city in 1722 by The Crown and served as the capital of Colonial Virginia from 1699 to 1780. During this time, the college served as a law center and lawmakers frequently used its buildings. It educated future U.S. Presidents Thomas Jefferson, James Monroe, and John Tyler. The college has been called "the Alma Mater of a Nation" because of its close ties to America's founding fathers, as well as figures pivotal to the development and expansion of the United States. George Washington, who received his surveyor's license through the college despite never attending, was the college's first American chancellor. William & Mary is famous for its firsts: the first U.S. institution with a royal charter, the first Greek-letter society (Phi Beta Kappa, founded in 1776), the first collegiate society in the country (F.H.C. Society, founded in 1750), the first student honor code and the first collegiate law school in America.

Revolution and transition

During the period of the American Revolution, freedom of religion was established in Virginia notably with the 1786 passage of the Virginia Statute for Religious Freedom. Future U.S. President James Madison was a key figure in the transition to religious freedom in Virginia, and Right Reverend James Madison, his cousin and Thomas Jefferson, who was on the Board of Visitors, helped the College of William & Mary to make the transition as well. In 1779 the college established graduate schools in law and medicine, making it one of the institutions that claims to be the first university in the United States. As its president, Reverend Madison worked with the new leaders of Virginia, most notably Jefferson, on a reorganization and changes for the college which included the abolition of the Divinity School and the Indian School and the establishment of the first elective system of study and honor system.

The College of William & Mary is home to the nation's first collegiate secret society, the F.H.C. Society, popularly known as the Flat Hat Club, founded November 11, 1750. On December 5, 1776, students John Heath and William Short (Class of 1779) founded Phi Beta Kappa as a secret literary and philosophical society. Other secret societies known to currently exist at the college include: The 7 Society, 13 Club, Alpha Club, Bishop James Madison Society, The Society, The Spades, W Society, and Wren Society.

Thomas R. Dew, professor of history, metaphysics, and political economy, and then president of William & Mary from 1836 until his death in 1846, was an influential academic defender of slavery.

In 1842, alumni of the college formed the Society of the Alumni which is now the sixth oldest alumni organization in the United States. In 1859, a great fire destroyed the College Building. The Alumni House is one of the few original antebellum structures remaining on campus; notable others include the Wren Building, the President's House, the Brafferton, and Prince George House.

Civil War, Reconstruction, and the early 20th century

At the outset of the American Civil War (1861–1865), enlistments in the Confederate States Army depleted the student body; and on May 10, 1861, the faculty voted to close the college for the duration of the conflict. General Charles A. Whittier reported that "thirty-two out of thirty-five professors and instructors abandoned the college work and joined the army in the field". The College Building was used as a Confederate barracks and later as a hospital, first by Confederate, and later Union forces. The Battle of Williamsburg was fought nearby during the Peninsula Campaign on May 5, 1862, and the city was captured by the Union army the next day. The Brafferton building of the college was used for a time as quarters for the commanding officer of the Union garrison occupying the town. On September 9, 1862, drunken soldiers of the 5th Pennsylvania Cavalry set fire to the College Building, purportedly in an attempt to prevent Confederate snipers from using it for cover.

Following the restoration of the Union, Virginia was destitute from the War. The college's 16th president, Benjamin Stoddert Ewell, finally reopened the school in 1869 using his funds but the college closed in 1882 due to lack of funds. In 1888, William & Mary resumed operations under an amended charter when the Commonwealth of Virginia passed an act appropriating $10,000 to support the college as a teacher-training institution. Lyon Gardiner Tyler (son of US President and alumnus John Tyler) became the 17th president of the college following President Ewell's retirement. Tyler, along with the 18th president J. A. C. Chandler, expanded the college into a modern institution. In March 1906, the General Assembly passed an act taking over the grounds of the colonial institution, and it has remained publicly supported ever since. In 1918, William & Mary became one of the first universities in Virginia to admit women and become coeducational. During this time, enrollment increased from 104 students in 1889 to 1269 students by 1932. 

Largely thanks to the vision of William & Mary instructor Reverend Dr. W. A. R. Goodwin, the College Building, the President's House and the Brafferton (originally the Indian School) were restored to their 18th-century appearance between 1928 and 1932 with substantial financial support from John D. Rockefeller, Jr. and his wife, Abby Aldrich Rockefeller. Together, they led the establishment and beginnings of Colonial Williamsburg.

1930–present

In 1930, William & Mary expanded its territorial range by establishing a branch in Norfolk, Virginia – The Norfolk Division of the College of William & Mary. This extension would eventually become the independent state-supported institution known as Old Dominion University.

Significant campus construction continued under the college's nineteenth president, John Stewart Bryan. President Franklin D. Roosevelt received an honorary degree from the college on October 20, 1934. In 1935, the Sunken Garden was constructed, just west of the Wren Building. The sunken design is taken from a similar landscape feature at Royal Hospital Chelsea in London, designed by Sir Christopher Wren.

In 1945 the editor-in-chief of The Flat Hat, Marilyn Kaemmerle, wrote an editorial "Lincoln's Job Half-Done..." that supported the end of  racial segregation, anti-miscegenation laws and white supremacy; the university administration removed her from the newspaper and nearly expelled her. According to Time magazine, in response, over one-thousand William & Mary students held "a spirited mass meeting protesting infringement of the sacred principles of freedom of the press bequeathed by Alumnus Thomas Jefferson." She was allowed to graduate but future editors had to discuss "controversial writings" with faculty before printing. The college Board of Visitors in the 1980s apologized to her.

The college admitted Hulon Willis into a graduate program in 1951 because the program was unavailable at Virginia State. However, the college did not open all programs to African-American students until around 1970.

In 1960, The Colleges of William & Mary, a short-lived five campus university system, was founded. It included the College of William & Mary, the Richmond Professional Institute, the Norfolk Division of the College of William & Mary, Christopher Newport College, and Richard Bland College. It was dissolved in 1962.

In 1974, Jay Winston Johns willed Highland, the  historic Albemarle County, Virginia estate of alumnus and U.S. President James Monroe, to the college. The college restored this historic presidential home near Charlottesville and opened it to the public.

Jefferson Hall, a student dormitory, was destroyed by fire on January 20, 1983, with no casualties. The building, including the destroyed west wing, was later rebuilt and reopened.

On July 25, 2012, Eastern Virginia Medical School (EVMS), in nearby Norfolk, Virginia made a joint announcement with William & Mary that the two schools were considering merging so EVMS would become the William & Mary School of Medicine. Any such merger would have to be confirmed by the two schools and then confirmed by the Virginia General Assembly and Governor. A pilot relationship, supported by a $200,000 grant in the Virginia budget, was subsequently agreed upon by both universities to examine this possible union in reality.

Throughout the second half of the 20th century, William & Mary has retained its historic ties to the United Kingdom and their royal family. In 1954, Queen Elizabeth The Queen Mother visited William & Mary as part of her tour of the United States, becoming the first member of the royal family to visit the college. In 1957, Queen Elizabeth II and Prince Philip, Duke of Edinburgh visited the college to commemorate the 350th anniversary of the landing at Jamestown. Queen Elizabeth gave a speech from the balcony of the Wren Building that drew over 20,000 people, the largest crowd ever seen in the city. In 1981, Charles, Prince of Wales visited to commemorate the 200th anniversary of the Battle of Yorktown. In 1988, the United States Congress selected William & Mary to send a delegation to the United Kingdom for the 300th anniversary of the ascension of King William III and Queen Mary II. Prince Charles would return to the college in 1993 for the 300th anniversary of William & Mary, and that same year William & Mary sent a delegation to meet with Queen Elizabeth II. Former Prime Minister Margaret Thatcher would be made the Chancellor of the College of William & Mary that same year. In 2007, Elizabeth II and Prince Philip would visit the college for a second time to recognize the 400th anniversary of the landing at Jamestown. In 2022, a beacon was lit in front of the Wren Building to celebrate the Platinum Jubilee of Queen Elizabeth II.

Campus
The college is on a  campus in Williamsburg, Virginia. In 2011, Travel+Leisure named William & Mary one of the most beautiful college campuses in the United States.

The Sir Christopher Wren Building is the oldest college building in the United States and a National Historic Landmark. The building, colloquially referred to as the "Wren Building", was named upon its renovation in 1931 to honor the English architect Sir Christopher Wren. The basis for the 1930s name is a 1724 history in which mathematics professor Hugh Jones stated the 1699 design was "first modelled by Sir Christopher Wren" and then was adapted "by the Gentlemen there" in Virginia; little is known about how it looked since it burned within a few years of its completion. Today's Wren Building is based on the design of its 1716 replacement. The college's alumni association has suggested Wren's connection to the 1931 building is a viable subject of investigation.

Two other buildings around the Wren Building compose an area known as "Ancient" or "Historic Campus": the Brafferton (built within 1723 and originally housing the Indian School, now the President and Provost's offices) and the President's House (built within 1732). In addition to the Ancient Campus, which dates to the 18th century, the college also consists of "Old Campus" and "New Campus". "Old Campus", adjacent to Ancient Campus, surrounds the Sunken Garden.

Adjoining "Old Campus" to the north and west is "New Campus". It was constructed primarily between 1950 and 1980, and it consists of academic buildings and dormitories that, while of the same brick construction as "Old Campus", fit into the vernacular of modern architecture. Beginning with the college's tercentenary in 1993, the college has embarked on a building and renovation program that favors the traditional architectural style of "Old Campus", while incorporating energy-efficient technologies. Several buildings constructed since the 1990s have been LEED certified. Additionally, as the buildings of "New Campus" are renovated after decades of use, several have been remodeled to incorporate more traditional architectural elements to unify the appearance of the entire college campus. "New Campus" is dominated by William and Mary Hall, Earl Gregg Swem Library, and formerly Phi Beta Kappa Memorial Hall. It also includes the offices and classrooms of the Mathematics, Physics, Psychology, Biology, and Chemistry Departments, the majority of freshman dormitories, the fraternity complex, the majority of the college's athletic fields and the Muscarelle Museum of Art. The newest addition to "New Campus" is Alan B. Miller Hall, the headquarters of the college's Mason School of Business.

The recent wave of construction at William & Mary has resulted in a new building for the School of Education, not far from Kaplan Hall (formerly William and Mary Hall). The offices and classrooms of the Government, Economics, and Classical Language Departments, share John E. Boswell Hall (formerly "Morton Hall") on "New Campus". These departments have been piecemeal separated and relocated to buildings recently renovated within the "Old Campus", such as Chancellors’ Hall.

The vast majority of William & Mary's  consists of woodlands and Lake Matoaka, an artificial lake created by colonists in the early 18th century.

Following the George Floyd protests and associated movements as well as student and faculty pressure in 2020 and 2021, several buildings, halls, and other entities were renamed. Maury Hall (named for Confederate sailor Matthew Fontaine Maury) on the Virginia Institute of Marine Science campus and Trinkle Hall (named for Governor Elbert Lee Trinkle) of Campus Center were renamed in September 2020 to York River Hall and Unity Hall respectively. In April 2021, three buildings were renamed at following a vote by the Board of Visitors: Morton Hall (named for professor Richard Lee Morton) to John E. Boswell Hall (for LGBT advocate and alum John Boswell), Taliaferro Hall (named for Confederate General William Taliaferro) to Hulon L. Willis Sr. Hall (Hulon Willis Sr. was the first Black student at the college), and Tyler Hall (named for President John Tyler and his son) to its original name of Chancellors’ Hall (the hall had been renamed in 1988).

Organization and administration

The Board of Visitors is a corporation established by the General Assembly of Virginia to govern and supervise the operation of the College of William & Mary and of Richard Bland College. The corporation is composed of 17 members appointed by the Governor of Virginia, based upon the recommendations made by the Society of the Alumni, to a maximum of two-successive four-year terms. The Board elects a Rector, Vice-Rector, and Secretary and the Board meets four times annually. The Board is responsible for appointing a president, related administrative officers, and an honorary chancellor, approving degrees, admission policies, departments, and schools, and executing the fiduciary duties of supervising the college's property and finances.

The Chancellor of the College of William & Mary is largely a ceremonial role. Until 1776, the position was held by an English subject, usually the Archbishop of Canterbury or the Bishop of London, who served as the college's advocate to the Crown, while a colonial President oversaw the day-to-day activities of the Williamsburg campus. Following the Revolutionary War, General George Washington was appointed as the first American chancellor; later United States President John Tyler held the post. The college has recently had several distinguished chancellors: former Chief Justice of the United States Warren E. Burger (1986–1993), former British Prime Minister Margaret Thatcher (1993–2000), former U.S. Secretary of State Henry Kissinger (2000–2005), and former U.S. Supreme Court Justice Sandra Day O'Connor (2005–2012). Former U.S. Secretary of Defense Robert M. Gates, himself an alumnus of the college, succeeded O'Connor in February 2012.

The Board of Visitors delegates to a president the operating responsibility and accountability for the administrative, fiscal, and academic performance of the college as well as representing the college on public occasions such as conferral of degrees. W. Taylor Reveley III, 27th President of the college, served from 2008 to 2018.  In February 2018, The Board of Visitors unanimously elected Katherine A. Rowe as Reveley's successor. Rowe is the first female president to serve the college since its founding.  The president is assisted by a provost, the senior academic officer of the university, and several vice presidents.

Faculty members are organized into separate faculties of the Faculty of Arts and Science as well as those for the respective schools of Business, Education, Law, and Virginia Institute of Marine Science. Each faculty is presided over by a dean, who reports to the provost, and governs itself through separate by-laws approved by the Board of Visitors. The faculty are also represented by a faculty assembly that serves to advise the president and provost.

The Royal Hospital School, an independent boarding school in the United Kingdom, is a sister institution.

Academics
The College of William & Mary is a medium-sized, highly residential, public research university. The focal point of the university is its four-year, full-time undergraduate program which constitutes most of the institution's enrollment. The college has a strong undergraduate arts & sciences focus, with a select number of graduate programs in diverse fields ranging from American colonial history to marine science. The college offers four academic programs in its Washington, DC office, an undergraduate joint degree program in engineering with Columbia University, as well as a liberal arts joint degree program with the University of St Andrews in Scotland.

The graduate programs are dominant in STEM fields and the university has a high level of research activity. For the 2016–17 academic year, 1,591 undergraduate, 652 masters, and 293 doctoral degrees were conferred. William & Mary is accredited by the Southern Association of Colleges and Schools.

William & Mary offers exchange programs with 15 foreign schools, drawing more than 12% of its undergraduates into these programs, and receives U.S. State Department grants to further expand its foreign exchange programs.

Academic departments
The college is organized into one faculty and four schools: 
Faculty of Arts and Sciences
Mason School of Business
School of Education
Marshall-Wythe School of Law
School of Marine Science (Virginia Institute of Marine Science) at Gloucester Point, Virginia

Learning environment
William & Mary is committed to ensuring the quality of its undergraduate teaching experience. To advance this mission, W&M provides a "small college environment" and maintains a low student-to-faculty ratio of 12-to-1 (the second lowest among U.S. public universities), thereby fostering student-professor interaction. A notable 99% of all undergraduate classes, excluding labs, are taught by professors (not teaching assistants) and 86% of all classes contain 40 or fewer students.

Student body and admissions

William & Mary enrolled 6,285 undergraduate and 2,455 postgraduate students in Fall 2018. Women made up 57.6% of the undergraduate and 50.7% of the graduate student bodies.

Admission to W&M is considered "most selective" according to U.S. News & World Report. There were 17,400 applications for admission to the class of 2025 (enrolling fall 2021): 5,200 will likely be admitted (29.9%) and approximately 1,590 will enroll (an admissions yield of 32%). The average high school GPA of enrolled freshmen was 4.24, and 94.2% had a high school GPA of 3.75 or higher. The middle 50% range on SAT scores was 660–730 for reading and 650–760 for math, while the ACT Composite middle 50% range was 30–33.

Undergraduate tuition for 2016–2017 was $13,127 for Virginia residents and $36,158 for out-of-state students.  W&M granted over $20.9 million in need-based scholarships in 2014–2015 to 1,734 undergraduates (27.5% of the undergraduate student body); 37% of the student body received loans, and average student indebtedness was $26,017. William & Mary is making efforts to grant more financial aid to applicants (and has a new plan that promises to freeze tuition hikes upon admission for all 4 years). However, research of William & Mary students published in 2016 and 2017 showed they continued to hail from overwhelmingly wealthy student family backgrounds, even as compared to other elite public institutions.

Rankings

In the 2022–23 U.S. News & World Report rankings, W&M ranks as tied for the 13th-best public university in the United States, tied for 41st-best national university in the U.S., and tied for 624th-best university in the world.  U.S. News & World Report also rated William & Mary's undergraduate teaching as the 4th best (tied with Princeton University) among 73 national universities and 13th best for Undergraduate Research/Creative Projects in its 2021 rankings.

For 2019 Kiplinger ranked William & Mary 6th out of 174 best-value public colleges and universities in the U.S.

In the 2019 "America's Top Colleges" ranking by Forbes, W&M was ranked the 9th best public college and 47th out of the 650 best private and public colleges and universities in the U.S. W&M ranked 3rd for race and class interaction in The Princeton Reviews 2018 rankings. The college was ranked as the public college with the smartest students in the nation according to Business Insider 2014 survey.

The undergraduate business program was ranked 12th among undergraduate programs by the 2016 Bloomberg Businessweek survey. Also in 2020, was W&M ranked 4th for "Colleges with the Happiest Students" by The Princeton Review and 9th in a list of the public universities that "pay off the most", according to CNBC.

Publications
The Omohundro Institute of Early American History and Culture publishes the William and Mary Quarterly, a scholarly journal focusing on colonial history, particularly in North America and the Atlantic World from the Age of Discovery onward.

In addition to the Quarterly, W&M, by its mission to provide undergraduates with a thorough grounding in research also hosts several student journals. The Monitor is the undergraduate journal of International Studies which publishes on a bi-annual basis. The Lyon Gardiner Tyler Department of History also supports an undergraduate history journal, The James Blair Historical Review, which publishes on an annual basis.

Non-academic publications include The William & Mary Review – the college's official literary magazine – Winged Nation – a student literary arts magazine, Acropolis – the art and art history magazine, The Flat Hat – the student newspaper, The Botetourt Squat – the student satirical newspaper, The Colonial Echo – the college's yearbook, Tribe Attaché - the student news blog covering international events, The DoG Street Journal – a daily online newspaper, and Rocket Magazine – the college's fashion, art, and photography publication.

Faculty

Since the 17th century, many prominent academics have chosen to teach at William & Mary. Distinguished faculty include the first professor of law in the United States, George Wythe (who taught Henry Clay, John Marshall, and Thomas Jefferson, among others); William Small (Thomas Jefferson's cherished mentor); William and Thomas Dawson, who were also presidents of William & Mary. Also, the founder and first president of the Massachusetts Institute of Technology – William Barton Rogers – taught chemistry at William & Mary (which was also Professor Barton's alma mater). Several members of the socially elite and politically influential Tucker family, including Nathaniel Beverley, St. George, and Henry St. George Tucker Sr. (who penned the original honor code pledge for the University of Virginia that remains in use there today), taught at William & Mary.

More recently, William & Mary recruited the constitutional scholar William Van Alstyne from Duke Law School. Lawrence Wilkerson, current Harriman Visiting Professor of Government and Public Policy, was chief of staff for Colin Powell. Susan Wise Bauer is an author and founder of Peace Hill Press who teaches writing and American literature at the college. James Axtell, who teaches history, was inducted into the American Academy of Arts and Sciences as a Fellow in 2004. Iyabo Obasanjo, a previous senator of Nigeria and daughter of former President Olusegun Obasanjo of Nigeria, also serves as faculty in Kinesiology & Health Sciences.

Professor Benjamin Bolger – the second-most credentialed person in modern history behind Michael Nicholson – taught at W&M.

Student life

Campus activities
The college enjoys a temperate climate. In addition to the college's extensive student recreation facilities (which include a large gym, a rock-climbing wall, and many exercise rooms) and programs (facilitating involvement in outdoor recreation, as well as club and intramural sports), the largely wooded campus has its own lake and outdoor amphitheater. Also, the beaches of the Delmarva Peninsula are just a few hours away via the Chesapeake Bay Bridge-Tunnel.

The college's Alma Mater Productions (AMP) hosts concerts, comedians, and speakers on campus and in the 8,600-person capacity Kaplan Arena, as well as putting on many smaller activity-based events. Students produce numerous publications on campus, including the official student newspaper The Flat Hat, arts and fashion magazine Rocket Magazine, and the satirical newspaper The Botetourt Squat. The school's television station, WMTV, produces content in the categories of cuisine, comedy, travel, and sports. Everyday Gourmet, the former flagship production of the station, was featured in USA Today in 2009. WCWM, the college's student-run public radio station, transmits 24 hours a day on 90.9 FM locally and online  and features student-curated and created content; they also put on an annual concert, WCWM Fest, featuring local and touring musicians.

The college also hosts several prominent student-run culture- and identity-based organizations. These include the Black Student Organization, Catholic Campus Ministry, Hillel (the college's official Jewish student group), Asian American Student Initiative, Latin American Student Union, Lambda Alliance and Rainbow Coalition, and the Middle Eastern Students Association, among many others.

The college's International Relations Club (IRC) ranked eleventh of twenty-five participants in the 2020-2021 North American College Model U.N.

Honor system
William & Mary's honor system was first established by alumnus Thomas Jefferson in 1779 and is widely believed to be the nation's first. During the orientation week, every entering student recites the Honor Pledge in the Great Hall of the Wren Building pledging:

The basis of W&M's Honor Pledge was written over 150 years ago by alumnus and law professor Henry St. George Tucker Sr. While teaching law at the University of Virginia, Tucker proposed students attach a pledge to all exams confirming on their honor they did not receive any assistance. Tucker's honor pledge was the early basis of the Honor System at the University of Virginia. At W&M, the Honor System stands as one of the college's most important traditions; it remains student-administered through the Honor Council with the advice of the faculty and administration of the college. The college's Honor System is codified such that students found guilty of cheating, stealing or lying are subject to sanctions ranging anywhere from a verbal warning up to expulsion.

Student Code of Conduct

W&M considers the observance of public laws of equal importance to the observance of its particular regulations. William & Mary's Board of Visitors delegates authority for discipline to its president. The President oversees a hierarchy of disciplinary authorities to enforce local laws as it pertains to William & Mary's interest as well as its internal regulatory system.

Traditions

William & Mary has several traditions, including the Yule Log Ceremony, at which the president dresses as Santa Claus and reads a rendition of "How the Grinch Stole Christmas", the Vice-President of Student Affairs reads "Twas the Night Before Finals", and The Gentlemen of the College sing the song "The Twelve Days of Christmas". Christmas is a grand celebration at the college; decorated Christmas trees abound on campus. This popular tradition started when German immigrant Charles Minnigerode, a humanities professor at the college in 1842 who taught Latin and Greek, brought one of the first Christmas trees to America. Entering into the social life of post-colonial Virginia, Minnigerode introduced the German custom of decorating an evergreen tree at Christmas at the home of law professor St. George Tucker, thereby becoming another of many influences that prompted Americans to adopt the practice at about that time.

Incoming freshmen participate in Opening Convocation, at which they pass through the entrance of the Wren Building and are officially welcomed as the newest members of the college. Freshmen also have the opportunity, during orientation week, to serenade the president of the college at his home with the Alma Mater song. The Senior Walk is similar, in that graduating seniors walk through the Wren Building in their "departure" from the college. On the last day of classes, Seniors are invited to ring the bell in the cupola of the Wren Building.

W&M also takes pride in its connections to its colonial past during Charter Day festivities. Charter Day is technically February 8, based on the date (from the Julian Calendar) that the Reverend James Blair, first president of the college received the charter from the Court of William III and Mary II at Kensington Palace in 1693. Past Charter Day speakers have included former US President John Tyler, Henry Kissinger, Margaret Thatcher, and Robert Gates.

Another underground tradition at W&M is known as the "Triathalon". As reported by The Flat Hat, the tradition - normally performed prior to graduation - involves completing three activities: jumping the walls of the Governor's Palace in Colonial Williamsburg, streaking through the Sunken Garden, and finally swimming in the Crim Dell. The tradition has been referred to as an underground one and is not sanctioned by the college but is still widely practiced.

A unique tradition at William & Mary is the annual Raft Debate. Described by the college as "a 'delicate balance of comedy and lecture,' the annual Raft Debate features four W&M faculty members from diverse disciplines, stranded on a desolate island with only a one-person life raft for escape to civilization. Based on the volume of applause, the audience chooses the sole survivor as the professors cajole, plead, pontificate, and resort shamelessly to props and costumes. The quirky event originated in the mid-1900s and was revived during the 2000s by the Graduate Center, the A&S Office of Graduate Studies and Research, and the A&S Graduate Student Association. Faculty participants represent the Humanities, the Social Sciences, or the Natural and Computational Sciences. The Devil's Advocate, who argues sarcastically that none of the academic disciplines are worth saving, has on rare occasion emerged victoriously."

Commencement exercises each year begin with the senior class walking through the Wren Building and across the campus, crossing the Crim Dell bridge, and arriving at William & Mary Hall (Kaplan Arena) for the commencement ceremony. The graduating class processes into the arena as the Choir of the College of William & Mary sings the William & Mary Hymn. Since 2018, the venue for graduation ceremony has been changed to Zable Stadium due to the renovation of Kaplan Arena.

Fraternities and sororities

William & Mary has a long history of fraternities and sororities dating back to 1750 and the founding of the F.H.C. Society, the first collegiate fraternity established in what now is the United States.  Phi Beta Kappa, the first "Greek-letter" fraternity, was founded at the college in 1776.

Today, various Greek-letter organizations play an important role in the college community, along with such other social organizations as theatre and club sport groups.  Overall, about one-third of undergraduate students are active members of one or another of 16 national fraternities and 13 sororities.  William & Mary is also home to several unusual fraternal or similar organizations, including the Nu Kappa Epsilon music sorority and its male counterpart, Phi Mu Alpha Sinfonia; the Alpha Phi Omega co-ed service fraternity; gender-inclusive Phi Sigma Pi and other honor fraternities.

The Queen's Guard 

The Queen's Guard was established on Feb. 8, 1961, as a special unit of the Army Reserve Officers' Training Corps and is now affiliated with the Pershing Rifles. The Guard was described by former President Davis Y. Paschall as "a unit organized, outfitted with special uniforms, and trained in appropriate drills and ceremonies as will represent the College of William & Mary in Virginia on such occasions and in such events as may be approved by the President." The uniform of the Guard loosely resemble that of the Scots Guard of the United Kingdom. The baldric is a pleated Stuart tartan, in honor of Queen Mary II and Queen Anne. Following a hazing citation in fall 2019 by the college's Community Values & Restorative Practices organization, the Queen's Guard was suspended until at least spring 2022.

Music
William & Mary has eleven collegiate a cappella groups: The Christopher Wren Singers (1987, co-ed); The Gentlemen of the College (1990, all-male); The Stairwells (1990, all-male); Intonations (1990, all-female); Reveille (1992, all-female); The Accidentals (1992, all-female); DoubleTake (1993, co-ed); The Cleftomaniacs (1999, co-ed); Passing Notes (2002, all-female); The Tribetones (2015, all-female); and the Crim Dell Criers (2019, co-ed). Sinfonicron Light Opera Company, founded in 1965, is William & Mary's student run light opera company, producing musicals (traditionally those by Gilbert & Sullivan) in the early spring of each academic year. Music societies at the college include local chapters of the music honor societies Delta Omicron (co-ed) and Phi Mu Alpha (all-male) as well as Nu Kappa Epsilon (all-female). Nu Kappa Epsilon, founded in 1994 at William & Mary, is "dedicated to promoting the growth and development of musical activities at the college as well as in the Williamsburg community".

Large musical ensembles include a symphony orchestra, wind symphony, and four choral ensembles: The William & Mary Choir, The Botetourt Chamber Singers, The Barksdale Treble Chorus (formerly the William & Mary Women's Chorus), and Ebony Expressions Gospel Choir. The Botetourt Chamber Singers (1974, co-ed) are the student chamber choir. Other musical ensembles at the college include an Early Music Ensemble, featuring medieval, renaissance and baroque music, a Jazz combo ensemble, a Jazz ensemble, the Wham Bam Big Band, and a Mixed Ensemble which features chamber music, as well as an Opera workshop, a percussion ensemble, saxophone ensemble, string ensemble, a viol ensemble, and a wind ensemble. In addition to these traditional groups W&M offers a number of non-traditional and world music ensembles such as The Appalachian Music Ensemble, Indonesian Gamelan, Middle Eastern Music Ensemble, and performance art ensemble. Prior to 1996 the college also had a formal Marching Band, however from 1996 to present the college has joined the likes of Columbia University in having a scramble band on campus, known as the William & Mary Pep Band.

William & Mary's radio station, WCWM, has been on the air since 1959. Student and faculty DJs broadcast a variety of original programming and organize music performances such as the annual WCWM Fest.

Comedy groups
William & Mary has multiple campus comedy groups. I.T. (short for Improvisational Theatre), was founded in 1986 and is the oldest group on campus.  The sketch comedy ensemble 7th Grade Sketch Comedy has been in existence since 1997. In 2012 a new improvisational group, Sandbox Improv, was formed. While I.T. performs short form and long-form improv, Sandbox Improv is the only exclusively long-form improvisational team on campus. Dad Jeans Improv, around since 2016, is an improv troupe that specializes in long-form improvisation with a technical element of some sort in each show. Trippin' On Brix is William & Mary's sketch and improv group.

Athletics

Formerly known as the "Indians", William & Mary's athletic teams are now known as the "Tribe". The college fields NCAA Division I teams for men and women in basketball, cross country, golf, gymnastics, soccer, swimming, tennis, and indoor and outdoor track and field. Also, there are women's field hockey, lacrosse and volleyball squads as well as men's baseball and football. In the 2004–05 season, the Tribe garnered five Colonial Athletic Association titles, and it leads the conference with over 80 titles. That same year, several teams competed in the NCAA Championships, with the football team appearing in the Division I-AA national semifinals. The men's cross country team finished 8th and 5th within the Division I NCAA Men's Cross Country Championship in 2006 and 2009, respectively. The William & Mary men's basketball team is one of four original Division I schools that have never been to the NCAA Division I men's basketball tournament.

There have been many recent notable athletes who competed for the Tribe. On the men's soccer team, goalkeeper Adin Brown was a back-to-back NCAA First Team All-American in 1998 and 1999. The track program has produced several All-Americans, including Brian Hyde, an Olympian and collegiate record holder in the 1500-meter run, and Ed Moran, a gold medalist in the 5000-meter run at the 2007 Pan American Games. The baseball program boasts a handful of current MLB players, including relief pitcher Bill Bray with the Cleveland Indians organization, 11-year MLB career Curtis Pride Montreal Expos, New York Yankees, Atlanta Braves, Detroit Tigers, and Colorado Rockies utility infielder Brendan Harris. The football program has also produced numerous NFL players and coaches: All-Pro safety Darren Sharper, current Pittsburgh Steelers head coach Mike Tomlin, current Buffalo Bills head coach Sean McDermott, cornerback Derek Cox, kicker Steve Christie, long snapper Mike Leach, Walter Payton Award-winning quarterback Lang Campbell, wide receiver Dominique Thompson, Pro Football Hall of Fame coaches Marv Levy and Lou Holtz, and Jacksonville Jaguars linebackers coach Mark Duffner. Jill Ellis, former head coach of the United States women's national soccer team, graduated from the college, as did Todd Boehly, co-owner of Chelsea Football Club in London.

In May 2006, the NCAA ruled that the athletic logo, which includes two green and gold feathers, could create an environment offensive to the American Indian community. The college's appeal regarding the use of the institution's athletic logo to the NCAA Executive Committee was rejected. The "Tribe" nickname, by itself, was found to be neither hostile nor abusive, but rather communicates ennobling sentiments of commitment, shared idealism, community and common cause. The college stated it would phase out the use of the two feathers by the fall of 2007, although they can still be seen prominently painted on streets throughout the campus.

In 2018, athletic director Samantha Huge introduced a new brand kit for the department, officially retiring and de-emphasizing the script "Tribe" logo.

The "Tribe 2025" plan, a comprehensive plan for the athletics department to raise national prominence, undergo significant facilities upgrades, and achieve higher levels of student involvement and spirit, was presented in 2019. In 2020, William & Mary announced that due to financial concerns they would be discontinuing 7 varsity sports: men's and women's gymnastics, men's and women's swimming, men's indoor and outdoor track and field and volleyball. This decision prompted a petition entitled "save the Tribe 7" which received significant support. On October 19 the university reinstated women's gymnastics, women's swimming, and volleyball after notice of an impending lawsuit on the grounds of title IX violations. President Rowe later announced that the decision to cancel the 4 men's programs would be put off until the 2021-2022 academic year.

Alumni

Though a historically small college, William & Mary's alumni are a variety of highly influential and historically significant people, among which include: four of the first ten presidents of the United States, four United States Supreme Court justices, dozens of U.S. senators, members of government, six Rhodes Scholars, and three Marshall Scholars.

See also
Williamsburg Bray School
William & Mary scandal of 1951

Notes

References

External links

 
 
 Transcript of the Royal Charter

1693 establishments in Virginia
Anglican universities and colleges
Buildings and structures in Williamsburg, Virginia
 
Colonial colleges
Education in James City County, Virginia
Education in Williamsburg, Virginia
Educational institutions established in the 1690s
Native American history of Virginia
Public universities and colleges in Virginia
Schools with a royal charter
Tourist attractions in Williamsburg, Virginia
Universities and colleges accredited by the Southern Association of Colleges and Schools
William III of England